Ekaterina Andreeva (born 13 December 1993 in Vladimir) is a Russian swimmer. She swam at the 2012 Summer Olympics in the 200 m individual medley and was eliminated after the qualifying heats. In 2013 Andreeva was suspended for 18 months after she breached anti-doping regulations.

References 

1993 births
Living people
Russian female swimmers
Olympic swimmers of Russia
Swimmers at the 2012 Summer Olympics
Swimmers at the 2010 Summer Youth Olympics
Russian sportspeople in doping cases
Doping cases in swimming
20th-century Russian women
21st-century Russian women